Suharyadi, also known as Hary Suharyadi and as Suharyadi Suharyadi on documents (born 14 February 1965) is a former tennis player from Indonesia. He competed in three Summer Olympics; the 1984 Los Angeles Games, 1988 in Seoul and 1992 in Barcelona. 

He won gold on mixed doubles at the 1990 Asian Games in Beijing with Yayuk Basuki, whom he married on 31 January 1994 in Yogyakarta.

References

External links
 
 
 

1965 births
Living people
Indonesian male tennis players
Tennis players at the 1984 Summer Olympics
Tennis players at the 1988 Summer Olympics
Tennis players at the 1992 Summer Olympics
Olympic tennis players of Indonesia
Asian Games medalists in tennis
Tennis players at the 1990 Asian Games
Sportspeople from Jakarta
Medalists at the 1990 Asian Games
Asian Games gold medalists for Indonesia
Asian Games bronze medalists for Indonesia
Southeast Asian Games gold medalists for Indonesia
Southeast Asian Games silver medalists for Indonesia
Southeast Asian Games bronze medalists for Indonesia
Southeast Asian Games medalists in tennis
Competitors at the 1985 Southeast Asian Games
20th-century Indonesian people
21st-century Indonesian people